HSwMS Hvalen was a submarine of the Swedish Navy. Constructed in Italy, the submarine sailed the entire way to Sweden for her commissioning unaccompanied. In October 1915 she became involved in a diplomatic incident between neutral Sweden, and Germany, which was then engaged in fighting Britain in the First World War. Following a series of sinkings of German cargo ships and naval vessels in the Baltic sea by British submarines entering the Baltic through the (Swedish-controlled) Öresund straits, a German warship opened fire on Hvalen killing a crew-member. According to the captain of the Hvalen, she was flying the Swedish naval flag and in Swedish home waters at the time she was fired on.
  Compensation was later paid to the widow of the crew-member and an apology was issued.

References 

Submarines of the Swedish Navy
1909 ships
Ships built in Italy
Maritime incidents in 1915